Bill Hagan (born June 17, 1931) is a Canadian former professional ice hockey left winger, who was a member of the Jr. A Barrie Flyers under Hap Emms, who won the Memorial Cup in 1950–51. 

Hagan also played in the AHL with the Buffalo Bisons in 1951–52. He also played for the Vancouver Canucks of the PCHL in 1951–52, the Vancouver Canucks of the WHL in 1952–53, the Charlottetown Islanders of the MMHL in 1952–53, and the Troy Uncle Sam Trojans of the EHL in 1952–53. Hagan then played three years in the OHA Sr. A leagues for the Owen Sound Mercurys 1954–57.

References

1931 births
Living people
Barrie Flyers players
Buffalo Bisons (AHL) players
Canadian ice hockey left wingers
Ice hockey people from Simcoe County
Sportspeople from Barrie
Vancouver Canucks (WHL) players